Roots is an album by pianist Cedar Walton which was recorded in 1997 and released on the Astor Place label.

Reception
Allmusic reviewed the album stating "this is a solid, modern hard bop date that reaches its potential". All About Jazz observed "Cedar Walton is a treasure with an uncanny sense for composition, arrangement, and performance. His most recent recording Roots readily bears this out. His music is layered, as is his band... This is sophisticated and readily consumable mainstream jazz that is well recommended". JazzTimes said "Cedar Walton is an heir to those class acts that have made the piano so often the repository of the orchestral voice of jazz... Here he gets a chance to give voice to his muse through a larger ensemble... the compositions sound fresh-benefitting from these new arrangements and from the range of solo styles that play over them".

Track listing 
All compositions by Cedar Walton
 "Bolivia" - 6:28 		
 "Ojos de Rojo" - 7:57
 "When Love Is New" - 8:05
 "I'll Let You Know" - 6:24
 "Mode for Joe" - 6:28
 "Blue Monterey" - 5:22 		
 "Fantasy in D" - 4:52
 "Fiesta Español" - 6:37
 "Firm Roots" - 6:57

Personnel 
Cedar Walton - piano
Terence Blanchard - trumpet
Don Sickler - trumpet, flugelhorn
Scott Whitfield - trombone
Willie Williams - soprano saxophone, tenor saxophone
Bobby Porcelli - alto saxophone
Joshua Redman - tenor saxophone
Gary Smulyan - baritone saxophone
Mark Whitfield - guitar
Ron Carter - bass
Lewis Nash - drums 
Ray Mantilla - percussion

Production
Don Sickler - producer
Rudy Van Gelder - engineer

References 

Cedar Walton albums
1997 albums
Astor Place (label) albums
Albums recorded at Van Gelder Studio